Johannes Bergion is a Swedish cellist, songwriter and backing vocalist, most known for being one of the founding members of avant-garde metal band Diablo Swing Orchestra. He also played cello in various Hellsongs albums, and in the In Flames album Sounds of a Playground Fading.

Bergion is credited as one of the writers/composers of Diablo Swing Orchestra. However, according to Daniel Håkansson, the songs are mostly written by Håkansson and Pontus Mantefors.

Discography

Diablo Swing Orchestra

Studio albums 
 The Butcher's Ballroom (2006)
 Sing Along Songs for the Damned & Delirious (2009)
 Pandora's Piñata (2012)
 Pacifisticuffs (2017)

EPs 
 Borderline Hymns (2003)

Singles 
 "Voodoo Mon Amour" (2012)

Hellsongs 
 Lounge (2006)
 Hymns in the Key of 666 (2008)
 Minor Misdemeanors (2010)

As guest musician 
 Oh, Harry - Arena Rock (2010) in "Shift Happens"
 In Flames - Sounds of a Playground Fading (2011) in "A New Dawn"

References

External links 
Johannes Bergion interview
 

Heavy metal cellists
Avant-garde cellists
Swedish cellists
Year of birth missing (living people)
Living people
Diablo Swing Orchestra members